Once in a Very Blue Moon was singer-songwriter Nanci Griffith's third studio album. The album had more of a country sound than her previous albums. Her first two albums were backed sparsely with instrumentation, but starting with this album, the whole complement of country-styled instrumentalists can be heard. Noted country musicians performing on the album include banjo player, Béla Fleck, champion fiddle player, Mark O'Connor, and pedal steel master, Lloyd Green. The title song was covered by Dolly Parton, who included her version on her Real Love album in 1985.

Critical reception

Vik Iyengar at AllMusic wrote, "Nanci Griffith finds her voice on her third studio album, Once in a Very Blue Moon. This is the album where she established her musical identity – she is at home in many genres (which perhaps explains why she never gets played on formatted radio stations), and seamlessly blends folk, bluegrass, and country with a group of stellar musicians, including guitarist Pat Alger and a young banjo player named Béla Fleck." He concluded the review with, "This album marks the emergence of a major talent."

Track listing

Personnel
Nanci Griffith – acoustic guitar, lead vocals, harmony vocals
Pat Alger – acoustic guitar, sea gulls
John Catchings – cello
Philip Donnelly – electric guitar
Stephen Doster – acoustic guitar, electric guitar
Béla Fleck – banjo
Denise Franke – harmony vocals
Lloyd Green – dobro, pedal steel
Mark Howard – acoustic rhythm guitar, high-strung guitar
Roy Huskey Jr. – upright bass
Lyle Lovett – harmony vocals
Terry Mcmillan – harmonica
Kenny Malone – percussion
Mark O'Connor – piccolo mandolin, mandolin, fiddle, mandola
Ralph Vitello – piano, synthesizer

Production

Producer – Nanci Griffith
Cover Design – Nanci Griffith, Bill Narum
Cover Lettering – Bill Narum
Producer – Jim Rooney
Mastered by – Jim Lloyd
Executive Producer – Wayne R. Miller
Cover Photography – Daniel Schaefer, Wayne R. Miller
Front and back cover were shot at The Blue Moon Cafe, Austin, Texas
Special Assistance – Kevin Boyle, Gene Menger
Back Cover Diners – Humphrey Brown, Sr., Jacqui Brown, Jason Brown, Humphrey Brown, Jr., Nanci Griffith
Graphics – Marlin D. Griffith, Josephine Gibson

Track listing and credits adapted from the album's liner notes.

References 

Nanci Griffith albums
1984 albums